The Serie A, also called Serie A TIM for national sponsorship with TIM, is a professional league competition for football clubs located at the top of the Italian football league system and the winner is awarded the Scudetto and the Coppa Campioni d'Italia. It has been operating as a round-robin tournament for over ninety years since the 1929–30 season. It had been organized by the Direttorio Divisioni Superiori until 1943 and the Lega Calcio until 2010, when the Lega Serie A was created for the 2010–11 season. Serie A is regarded as one of the best football leagues in the world and it is often depicted as the most tactical and defensively sound national league. Serie A was the world's strongest national league in 2020 according to IFFHS, and is ranked fourth among European leagues according to UEFA's league coefficient – behind the Bundesliga, La Liga and the Premier League, and ahead of Ligue 1 – which is based on the performance of Italian clubs in the Champions League and the Europa League during the previous five years. Serie A led the UEFA ranking from 1986 to 1988 and from 1990 to 1999.

In its current format, the Italian Football Championship was revised from having regional and interregional rounds, to a single-tier league from the 1929–30 season onwards. The championship titles won before 1929 are officially recognised by FIGC with the same weighting as titles that were subsequently awarded. Similarly, the 1945–46 season, when the round-robin was suspended and the league was played over two geographical groups due to the ravages of World War II, is not statistically considered, even if its title is fully official.

The league hosts three of the world's most famous clubs as Juventus, AC Milan and Inter Milan, all founding members of the G-14, a group which represented the largest and most prestigious European football clubs from 2000 to 2008, with the first two also being founding members of its successive organisation, European Club Association (ECA). More players have won the Ballon d'Or award while playing at a Serie A club than any league in the world other than Spain's La Liga, although La Liga has the highest total number of Ballon d'Or winners. Juventus, Italy's most successful club of the 20th century and the most winning Italian team, is tied for sixth in Europe and twelfth in the world with the most official international titles with eleven. Prior the first Europa Conference League final in 2022, it was also the only one in the world to have won all the historical five official confederation competitions, an achievement reached after its triumph in the 1985 Intercontinental Cup and revalidated after winning a sixth tournament, the UEFA Intertoto Cup, fourteen years later. Milan is joint third club overall for official international titles won with eighteen. Inter, following their achievements in the 2009–10 season, became the first Italian team to have achieved a seasonal treble. It is also the team to have competed uninterruptedly for the most time in the top flight of Italian football, having seen its debut in 1909. All these clubs, along with Lazio, Fiorentina, Roma and Napoli, are known as the "seven sisters" of Italian football.

Serie A is one of the most storied football leagues in the world. Of the 100 greatest footballers in history chosen by FourFourTwo magazine in 2017, 42 players have played in Serie A, more than any other league in the world. Juventus is the team that has produced the most World Cup champions (27), with Inter (20), Roma (16) and Milan (10), being respectively third, fourth and ninth in that ranking.

History
Serie A, as it is structured today, began during the 1929–30 season. From 1898 to 1922, the competition was organised into regional groups. Because of ever growing teams attending regional championships, the Italian Football Federation (FIGC) split the CCI (Italian Football Confederation) in 1921, which founded in Milan the Lega Nord (Northern Football League), ancestor of present-day Lega Serie A. When CCI teams rejoined the FIGC created two interregional divisions renaming Categories into Divisions and splitting FIGC sections into two north–south leagues. In 1926, due to internal crises and fascist pressures, the FIGC changed internal settings, adding southern teams to the national division, ultimately leading to the 1929–30 final settlement. Torino were declared champions in the 1948–49 season following a plane crash near the end of the season in which the entire team was killed.

The Serie A Championship title is often referred to as the scudetto ("small shield") because since the 1923–24 season, the winning team will bear a small coat of arms with the Italian tricolour on their strip in the following season. The most successful club is Juventus with 36 championships, followed by Inter Milan and AC Milan with 19 championships. From the 2004–05 season onwards, an actual trophy was awarded to club on the pitch after the last turn of the championship. The trophy, called the Coppa Campioni d'Italia, has officially been used since the 1960–61 season, but between 1961 and 2004 was consigned to the winning clubs at the head office of the Lega Nazionale Professionisti.

In April 2009, Serie A announced a split from Serie B. Nineteen of the twenty clubs voted in favour of the move in an argument over television rights; the relegation-threatened Lecce had voted against the decision. Maurizio Beretta, the former head of Italy's employers' association, became president of the new league.

In April 2016, it was announced that Serie A was selected by the International Football Association Board to test video replays, which were initially private for the 2016–17 season, allowing them to become a live pilot phase, with replay assistance implemented in the 2017–18 season. On the decision, FIGC President Carlo Tavecchio said, "We were among the first supporters of using technology on the pitch and we believe we have everything required to offer our contribution to this important experiment."

Format
For most of Serie A's history, there were 16 or 18 clubs competing at the top level. Since 2004–05, however, there have been 20 clubs in total. One season (1947–48) was played with 21 teams for political reasons, following post-war tensions with Yugoslavia. Below is a complete record of how many teams played in each season throughout the league's history;
 18 clubs: 1929–1934
 16 clubs: 1934–1943
 20 clubs: 1946–1947
 21 clubs: 1947–1948
 20 clubs: 1948–1952
 18 clubs: 1952–1967
 16 clubs: 1967–1988
 18 clubs: 1988–2004
 20 clubs: 2004–present

During the season, which runs from August to May, each club plays each of the other teams twice; once at home and once away, totalling 38 games for each team by the end of the season. Thus, in Italian football a true round-robin format is used. In the first half of the season, called the andata, each team plays once against each league opponent, for a total of 19 games. In the second half of the season, called the ritorno, the teams play another 19 games, once more against each opponent, in which home and away matches are reversed. The two halves of the season had exactly the same order of fixtures until the 2021–22 season, when an asymmetrical calendar was introduced, following the format of the English, Spanish, and French leagues. Since the 1994–95 season, teams are awarded three points for a win, one point for a draw, and no points for a loss. Prior to this, teams were awarded two points for a win, one for a draw, and none for a loss. The three lowest-placed teams at the end of the season are relegated to Serie B, and three Serie B teams are promoted to replace them for the next season.

European qualification 
As of 2022, Serie A is ranked as the fourth-best league by UEFA coefficient, therefore the top four teams in the Serie A qualify straight to the UEFA Champions League group stage. The team finishing fifth, along with the Coppa Italia winner (if the Coppa Italia winner finishes outside the top five) or the team finishing sixth (if the Coppa Italia winner finishes inside the top five), qualify for the UEFA Europa League group stage. The sixth or the seventh ranked club, depending on the Coppa Italia winner's league performance, joins the final qualification round of the UEFA Europa Conference League.

Tiebreaking 
If after all 38 games there are two teams tied on points for first place or for 17th, the last safety spot, the team that wins the scudetto or stay up at 17th is decided by a single-legged play-off game of 90 minutes and penalties (no extra time), to be held at a neutral venue. If at least three teams are tied for one of those spots, then the two teams to play in the match is decided by a mini table between the teams involved using the tiebreakers below. For a tie in any other position the deciding tie-breakers are as follows:

 Head-to-head points
 Goal difference of head-to-head games
 Goal difference overall
 Higher number of goals scored
 Play-off game at a neutral venue if relevant to decide European qualification or relegation; otherwise by coin flip

Between 2006–07 and 2021–22, the tiebreakers currently used for all places to decide the scudetto winner if necessary, though this was never needed. Prior to 2005–06, a play-off would immediately be used if teams were tied for first place, a European qualification spot, or a relegation spot. In some past years, the playoff was a single game at a neutral site while in others it was a two-legged tie decided by aggregate score. A playoff game has never been needed since the tiebreaking format changed.

The only time a playoff was used to decide the champion occurred in the 1963–64 season when Bologna and Inter both finished on 54 points. Bologna won the playoff 2–0 at the Stadio Olimpico in Rome to win the scudetto. Playoff games were used on multiple occasions to decide European competition qualifications (most recently in 1999–2000) and relegation (most recently in 2004–05).

Clubs

Before 1929, many clubs competed in the top level of Italian football as the earlier rounds were competed up to 1922 on a regional basis then interregional up to 1929. Below is a list of Serie A clubs who have competed in the competition since it has been a league format (68 in total).

2022–23 season

Clubs
The following 20 clubs are competing in the Serie A during the 2022–23 season.

Maps

Seasons in Serie A
There are 68 teams that have taken part in 91 Serie A championships in a single round that was played from the 1929–30 season until the 2022–23 season. The teams in bold compete in Serie A currently. The year in parentheses represents the most recent year of participation at this level. Inter Milan is the only team that has played Serie A football in every season.

 91 seasons: Inter Milan (2023)
 90 seasons: Juventus (2023), Roma (2023)
 89 seasons: AC Milan (2023)
 85 seasons: Fiorentina (2023)
 80 seasons: Lazio (2023)
 79 seasons: Torino (2023)
 77 seasons: Napoli (2023)
 76 seasons: Bologna (2023)
 66 seasons: Sampdoria (2023)
 62 seasons: Atalanta (2023)
 55 seasons: Genoa (2022)
 50 seasons: Udinese (2023)
 42 seasons: Cagliari (2022)
 32 seasons: Hellas Verona (2023)
 30 seasons: Bari (2011), Vicenza (2001)
 29 seasons: Palermo (2017)
 27 seasons: Parma (2021)
 26 seasons: Triestina (1959)
 23 seasons: Brescia (2020)
 19 seasons: SPAL (2020)
 18 seasons: Livorno (2014)
 17 seasons: Catania (2014), Chievo (2019), Lecce (2023)
 16 seasons: Ascoli (2007), Padova (1996)
 15 seasons: Empoli (2023)
 13 seasons: Alessandria (1960), Cesena (2012), Como (2003), Modena (2004), Novara (2012), Perugia (2004), Venezia (2022)
 12 seasons: Pro Patria (1956)
 11 seasons: Foggia (1995)
 10 seasons: Avellino (1988), Sassuolo (2023)
 9 seasons: Reggina (2009), Siena (2013)
 8 seasons: Cremonese (2023), Lucchese (1952), Piacenza (2003), Sampierdarenese
 7 seasons: Catanzaro (1983), Mantova (1972), Pescara (2017), Pisa (1991), Varese (1975)
 6 seasons: Pro Vercelli (1935)
 5 seasons: Messina (2007)
 4 seasons: Casale (1934), Salernitana (2023)
 3 seasons: Crotone (2021), Lecco (1967), Legnano (1954), Reggiana (1997), Spezia (2023)
 2 seasons: Ancona (2004), Benevento (2021), Frosinone (2019), Ternana (1975)
 1 season: Carpi (2016), Monza (2023), Pistoiese (1981), Treviso (2006)

Logos
Serie A had logos that featured its sponsor Telecom Italia (TIM). The logo that was introduced in 2010 had a minor change in 2016 due to the change of the logo of Telecom Italia itself. In August 2018, a new logo was announced, and another one in August 2019.

Television rights

In the past, individual clubs competing in the league had the rights to sell their broadcast rights to specific channels throughout Italy, unlike in most other European countries. Currently, the two broadcasters in Italy are the satellite broadcaster Sky Italia and streaming platform DAZN for its own pay television networks; RAI is allowed to broadcast only highlights (in exclusive from 13:30 to 22:30 CET).
This is a list of television rights in Italy (since 2021–22):
 Sky Italia (3 matches per week)
 DAZN (all other matches)
 OneFootball (highlights)

Since the 2010–11 season, Serie A clubs have negotiated television rights collectively rather than on an individual club basis, having previously abandoned collective negotiation at the end of the 1998–99 season.

In the 1990s, Serie A was at its most popular in the United Kingdom when it was shown on Football Italia on Channel 4, although it has actually appeared on more UK channels than any other league, rarely staying in one place for long since 2002. Serie A has appeared in the UK on BSB's The Sports Channel (1990–91), Sky Sports (1991–1992), Channel 4 (1992–2002), Eurosport (2002–2004), Setanta Sports and Bravo (2004–2007), Channel 5 (2007–2008), ESPN (2009–2013), Eleven Sports Network (2018), Premier, FreeSports (2019–2021) and currently BT Sport (2013–2018; 2021–present).

In the United States, Serie A is currently shown on CBS Sports and its streaming network Paramount+. Prior to 2021–22 it was shown on the ESPN family of networks.

Champions

Although Serie A was not formed until 1929–30, the league recognizes clubs who were named Italian champions before the league's foundation.

Bold indicates clubs which play in the 2022–23 Serie A.

 A decoration was awarded to Spezia in 2002 by the FIGC for the 1944 wartime championship. However, the FIGC has stated that it cannot be considered as a scudetto.

By city

By region

Records

Boldface indicates a player still active in Serie A. Italics indicates a player active outside Serie A.

Most appearances

Most goals

Players

Non-EU players
Unlike La Liga, which imposed a quota on the number of non-EU players on each club, Serie A clubs could sign as many non-EU players as available on domestic transfer.

During the 1980s and 1990s, most Serie A clubs signed a large number of players from foreign nations (both EU and non-EU members). Notable foreign players to play in Serie A during this era included Irish international Liam Brady, England internationals Paul Gascoigne and David Platt, France's Michel Platini and Laurent Blanc, Lothar Matthäus and Jürgen Klinsmann from Germany, Dutchmen Ruud Gullit and Dennis Bergkamp, and Argentina's Diego Maradona.

But since the 2003–04 season, a quota has been imposed on each of the clubs limiting the number of non-EU, non-EFTA and non-Swiss players who may be signed from abroad each season, following provisional measures introduced in the 2002–03 season, which allowed Serie A and B clubs to sign only one non-EU player in the 2002 summer transfer window.

In the middle of the 2000–01 season, the old quota system was abolished, which no longer limited each team to having more than five non-EU players and using no more than three in each match. Concurrent with the abolishment of the quota, the FIGC had investigated footballers that used fake passports. Alberto and Warley, Alejandro Da Silva and Jorginho Paulista of Udinese; Fábio Júnior and Gustavo Bartelt of Roma; Dida of Milan; Álvaro Recoba of Inter; Thomas Job, Francis Zé, Jean Ondoa of Sampdoria; and Jeda and Dede of Vicenza were all banned in July 2001 for lengths ranging from six months to one year. However, most of the bans were subsequently reduced.

The number of non-EU players was reduced from 265 in 2002–03 season to 166 in 2006–07 season. It also included players who received EU status after their respective countries joined the EU (see 2004 and 2007 enlargement), which made players such as Adrian Mutu, Valeri Bojinov, Marek Jankulovski and Marius Stankevičius EU players.

The rule underwent minor changes in August 2004, June 2005, June 2006, and June 2007.

Since the 2008–09 season, three quotas have been awarded to clubs that do not have non-EU players in their squad (previously only newly promoted clubs could have three quotas); clubs that have one non-EU player have two quotas. Those clubs that have two non-EU players, are awarded one quota and one conditional quota, which is awarded after: 1) Transferred 1 non-EU player abroad, or 2) Release 1 non-EU player as free agent, or 3) A non-EU player received EU nationality. Clubs with three or more non-EU players, have two conditional quotas, but releasing two non-EU players as free agent, will only have one quota instead of two. Serie B and Lega Pro clubs cannot sign non-EU player from abroad, except those followed the club promoted from Serie D.

Large clubs with many foreigners usually borrow quotas from other clubs that have few foreigners or no foreigners in order to sign more non-EU players. For example, Adrian Mutu joined Juventus via Livorno in 2005, as at the time Romania was not a member of the EU. Other examples include Júlio César, Victor Obinna and Maxwell, who joined Inter from Chievo (first two) and Empoli respectively.

On 2 July 2010, the above conditional quota reduced back to one, though if a team did not have any non-EU players, that team could still sign up to three non-EU players. In 2011 the signing quota reverted to two.

Homegrown players
Serie A also imposed Homegrown players rule, a modification of Homegrown Player Rule (UEFA). Unlike UEFA, Serie A at first did not cap the number of players in first team squad at 25, meaning the club could employ more foreigners by increasing the size of the squad. However, a cap of 25 (under-21 players were excluded) was introduced to 2015–16 season (in 2015–16 season, squad simply require 8 homegrown players but not require 4 of them from their own youth team). In the 2016–17 season, the FIGC sanctioned Sassuolo for fielding ineligible player, Antonino Ragusa. Although the club did not exceed the capacity of 21 players that were not from their own youth team (only Domenico Berardi was eligible as youth product of their own) as well as under 21 of age (born 1995 or after, of which four players were eligible) in their 24-men call-up, It was reported that on Lega Serie A side the squad list was not updated.

In 2015–16 season, the following quota was announced.

FIFA World Players of the Year

  Lothar Matthäus: 1991 (Inter Milan)
  Marco van Basten: 1992 (AC Milan)
  Roberto Baggio: 1993 (Juventus)
  George Weah: 1995 (AC Milan)
  Ronaldo: 1997, 2002 (Inter Milan)
  Zinedine Zidane: 1998, 2000 (Juventus)
  Fabio Cannavaro: 2006 (Juventus)
  Kaká: 2007 (AC Milan)

See also

 Campionato Nazionale Primavera
 Coppa Campioni d'Italia
 Italian football clubs in international competitions
 List of foreign Serie A players
 List of Italian football club owners
 Serie A Awards
 UEFA coefficient

Notes

References

External links

 Official website 
 FIGC – Federazione Italiana Giuoco Calcio (Italian Football Association) 

 
1
1898 establishments in Italy
Sports leagues established in 1898
Italy
Professional sports leagues in Italy